is a small town located at the base of the Hidaka Mountain Range in Tokachi Subprefecture, Hokkaido, Japan. The name Shimizu is taken from the Ainu word "Pekerebetsu", which means bright clean river. As of 2011, the population of the town is 10,243, and its primary source of income is through agriculture. Shimizu, like many other towns in Hokkaido, is undergoing population decline.

Population 

As of September 2016, the town has an estimated population of 9,784 and a density of 24 persons per km². The total area is 402.18 km².

Geography 

The town of Shimizu lies within the Tokachi Subprefecture of Hokkaido, Japan. The town lies at the base of the Hidaka Mountain Range and has several towns nearby, including Shikaoi to the North, Shintoku to the West, Hidaka to the South, and Memuro to the East. The geography of the town of Shimizu is mostly flat, with a few low-lying hills to the North and West.

History 

The town of Shimizu began to settle in 1898, with a population of 99 people, working as cultivating farmers. It was not until 1936 that Shimizu gained status as a town. In 1907 a railway connecting Kushiro and Asahikawa was built, thereby connecting Shimizu. At the time, two lines ran through the town: the Tokachi line, and the Tooru Hiraku line. Another improvement that helped put the town on the map was the opening of Nissho Toge, a mountain pass running through the Hidaka Mountains, which opened in 1965. This National Highway, route 274, runs all the way to Hokkaidos capital city, Sapporo. 
In 1980, the town's cultural center opened, and is famous for the playing of Beethoven’s 9th Symphony. Every year, students from Shimizu High School practice singing the symphony, for an end of the year concert. The town's first swimming pool opened in 1983, and in 1990, both the town's library and local history museum were established.

Economy 

Shimizu has roughly 440 farmers, and 14,500 ha of farmland. Dairy farming, cattle farming, and sugar beet cultivation are some of the main types of agriculture that take place in Shimizu and the surrounding area.

Transportation 

The town has several means of transportation for getting in and out of town. A train line runs through town connecting neighboring towns Shintoku, Memuro, and capital city of Tokachi, Obihiro. Shimizu's station name is called Tokachi Shimizu. There is also a bus which runs from Obihiro, and makes a stop in Shimizu, bringing passengers to the New Chitose Airport in Sapporo. 
If driving, route 274 National Highway runs through town from Kita-ku Sapporo, going as far as Shibecha, Hokkaido in the Kushiro Subprefecture. The road runs a full length of 371.8 km (231.03 mi).
Another option for driving is taking the relatively new Dōtō Expressway, which starts in the town of Shimukappu, runs through Shimizu and ends in the town of Ashoro. The Expressway is also a good option if wanting to take a trip to the popular ski town of Tomamu, only a half-hour drive from Shimizu.

Recreation 

The town is in a prime location for skiers & snowboard enthusiasts alike in the winter, and becomes a haven for cyclists and motorcyclists in the warmer months.
 Skiing/Snowboarding 
Several ski hills are within a half-hour drive, including Tomamu Ski Hill and Memuro's Arashiyama Ski Hill.

Education 

Shimizu has several educational institutions in town including public schools grades 1-12, and a High School of Arts:
High School:
Shimizu High School, Hokkaido (prefectural)
High school of arts, Hokkaido  
 Junior high:
Two schools (Shimizu, Mikage)
 Elementary school
Two schools (Shimizu, Mikage)

International Exchange
In 1993, Shimizu and the town of Chelsea, Michigan began a sister city exchange program, where groups of 7th and 8th graders from Chelsea visit Japan and stay with a host family for just under two weeks. The exchange program started in 1993 by Brian Oakley (CHS Class of 1986), and continues to this day.

Shimizu is also in connection with the JET Programme, which contracts out two ALT's to Shimizu. ALT's working for the town's board of education are hired from Michigan, and work at the town's elementary and junior high schools. JET's working for the town's high school, are hired through the Hokkaidō Prefectural Board of Education, and are not in connection with the town's sister town.

Mascots

Ut-chan is a tomboyish Japanese bush warbler who loves to play ice hockey and do skiing. She also attends matsuri festivals. She is unveiled in 1990. 
Hataraku-kun is a water alien who is Ut-chan's assistant. His name comes from the Ainu word "pekerebetsu" meaning a bright and pure river. He is unveiled in 2010.

Notable people from Shimizu
Miho Oki, former racing cyclist
Shota Sakaki, football player

See also
Hidaka Mountains
Japan National Route 274 
Mount Sahoro
Doto Expressway

References

External links

Official Website 

Towns in Hokkaido